Rose and Jasmine Garden is a public garden located within the recreational area of Shakarparian near Sports Complex Aabpara, on Kashmir Highway in Islamabad, Capital Territory, Pakistan.

The garden runs under the administration of Capital Development Authority. It contains various varieties of flowers and herbs in it, especially roses and jasmines. The garden is located near Pakistan-China center, it is accessible through Pakistan's monument road. People who visit Pakistan Monument and Shakarparian also pay visit to this stunning garden.

Public services 
Some of the facilities here include:
 Sitting
 Picnic point
 Walking and running track
 Cycling track
 Cafeteria (Dhaba)
 Parking area

See also 
 List of parks and gardens in Pakistan

References 

Parks in Pakistan
Tourist attractions in Islamabad